Tozawa (written: 戸澤 or 戸沢) is a Japanese surname. Notable people with the surname include:

 (born 1985), Japanese professional wrestler
 (1585–1648), Japanese samurai and daimyō

See also
, village in Mogami District, Yamagata, Japan

Japanese-language surnames